Proctacanthus is a genus of robber flies (insects in the family Asilidae). There are about 18 described species in Proctacanthus.

Species
 Proctacanthus brevipennis (Wiedemann, 1828)
 Proctacanthus coquillettii Hine, 1911
 Proctacanthus distinctus (Wiedemann, 1828)
 Proctacanthus duryi Hine, 1911
 Proctacanthus fulviventris Macquart, 1850
 Proctacanthus gracilis Bromley, 1928
 Proctacanthus heros (Wiedemann, 1828)
 Proctacanthus hinei Bromley, 1928
 Proctacanthus longus (Wiedemann, 1821)
 Proctacanthus micans Schiner, 1867
 Proctacanthus milbertii Macquart, 1838 (Milbert's proctacanthus)
 Proctacanthus nearno Martin, 1962
 Proctacanthus nigriventris Macquart, 1838
 Proctacanthus nigrofemoratus Hine, 1911
 Proctacanthus occidentalis (Hine, 1911)
 Proctacanthus philadelphicus Macquart, 1838
 Proctacanthus rodecki James, 1933
 Proctacanthus rufus Williston, 1885

References

Further reading

 Arnett, Ross H. (2000). American Insects: A Handbook of the Insects of America North of Mexico. CRC Press.

External links

 Diptera.info

Asilidae genera